Josiah Ellis DuBois Jr. (October 21, 1912 – August 1, 1983) was an American attorney at the U.S. Treasury Department who played a major role in exposing  State Department obstruction efforts to provide American visas to Jews trying to escape Nazi Europe. In 1944, he wrote the Report to the Secretary on the Acquiescence of This Government in the Murder of the Jews, which led to the creation of the War Refugee Board.  After the war, he was a prosecutor at the Nuremberg Trials prosecuting Nazi war crimes, particularly in the prosecution of holocaust chemical manufacturer I.G. Farben.

Background
DuBois was born in Camden and raised in Woodbury, New Jersey, the eldest of at least eight children born to Josiah DuBois Sr. and Amelia Ayles DuBois.  In 1934, he graduated from the University of Pennsylvania Law School.

Career

Dubois served as special assistant to the Secretary of the Treasury, 1944–45; general counsel of the War Refugee Board, 1944; member of the Allied Reparations Commission, Moscow, 1945; member of the U.S. delegation to the Potsdam Conference, 1945; and deputy chief counsel for War Crimes in charge of the I.G. Farben case, Nuremberg, Germany, 1947-48

Report on US acquiescence in Holocaust

DuBois wrote the famous Report to the Secretary on the Acquiescence of This Government in the Murder of the Jews, which Treasury Secretary Henry Morgenthau Jr. used to convince President Franklin Roosevelt to establish the War Refugee Board in 1944. Randolph Paul was also a principal sponsor of this report, the first contemporaneous Government paper attacking America's policies during  The Holocaust.

This document was an indictment of the U.S. State Department’s diplomatic, military, and immigration policies. Among other things, the Report narrated the State Department’s inaction and in some instances active opposition to the release of funds for the rescue of Jews in Romania and German-occupied France during World War II, and condemned immigration policies that closed American doors to Jewish refugees from countries then engaged in their systematic slaughter.

The catalyst for the Report was an incident involving 70,000 Jews whose evacuation from Romania could have been procured with a $170,000 bribe. The Foreign Funds Control unit of the Treasury, which was within Paul’s jurisdiction, authorized the payment of the funds, the release of which both the President and Secretary of State Cordell Hull supported. From mid-July 1943, when the proposal was made and Treasury approved, through December 1943, a combination of the State Department’s bureaucracy and the British Ministry of Economic Warfare interposed various obstacles. The Report was the product of frustration over that event.

On January 16, 1944, Morgenthau and Paul personally delivered the paper to President Roosevelt, warning him that Congress would act if he did not. The result was Executive Order 9417 creating the War Refugee Board composed of the Secretaries of State, Treasury and War. Issued on January 22, 1944, the Executive Order declared that "it is the policy of this Government to take all measures within its power to rescue the victims of enemy oppression who are in imminent danger of death and otherwise to afford such victims all possible relief and assistance consistent with the successful prosecution of the war."

Nuremberg Military Trials
DuBois was put in charge of the IG Farben trial at the Nuremberg Military Trials (1946-1949).  Later, he wrote the seminal account of that trial, The Devil's Chemists.

Alleged communist leanings

On July 9, 1947, US Representative George Anthony Dondero included Dubois when publicly questioning the "fitness" of United States Secretary of War Robert P. Patterson for failing to ferret out Communist infiltrators in his department.  The cause for concern arose from what Dondero called Patteron's lack of ability to "fathom the wiles of the international Communist conspiracy" and to counteract them with "competent personnel."  Dondero cited ten government personnel in the War Department who had Communist backgrounds or leanings:
 Colonel Bernard Bernstein
 Russel A. Nixon
 Abraham L. Pomerantz
 Josiah E. DuBois Jr.
 Richard Sasuly
 George Shaw Wheeler
 Heinz Norden
 Max Lowenthal
 Allen Rosenberg (member of Lowenthal's staff)
Dondero stated, "It is with considerable regret that I am forced to the conclusion the Secretary Patterson falls short of these standards."

Works

Books

Memos
 Report to the Secretary on the Acquiescence of This Government in the Murder of the Jews (Jan. 3, 1944)

See also
 International response to the Holocaust

References

Further reading

External links

 Primary Sources, "America and the Holocaust", program by the TV series "American Experience" on PBS.

1912 births
1983 deaths
The Holocaust and the United States
University of Pennsylvania Law School alumni
American people of World War II
Franklin D. Roosevelt administration personnel
People from Woodbury, New Jersey